Hacienda Barrancas (also called Finca Barrancas) is a populated place in the Machuelo Arriba Barrio in the municipality of Ponce, Puerto Rico.

History
In May 2006 a preliminary study was done on the possibility of developing a 2300-unit housing development in Hacienda Barrancas.

Notable people
 Antonio Correa Cotto, a famous outlaw

References

External links

Barrio Machuelo Arriba